Ingram is an unincorporated community in Bell County, Kentucky, United States. Ingram has a post office with ZIP code 40955, which opened on July 15, 1881.

References

Unincorporated communities in Bell County, Kentucky
Unincorporated communities in Kentucky